Rajdeep Sardesai (born 24 May 1965) is an Indian news anchor, reporter, journalist and author. He is a consulting editor and an anchor of India Today Television. He was the Editor-in-Chief of Global Broadcast News, that included CNN-IBN, IBN7 and IBN-Lokmat, before resigning in July 2014.

Early life 
Sardesai was born in Ahmedabad, Gujarat to a Goan father and a Gujarati mother. His father, Dilip Sardesai, was a former Indian Test cricketer and his mother, Nandini, is an activist in Mumbai and former head of the Department of Sociology at St. Xavier's College, Mumbai. He completed his schooling up to ICSE from the Campion School, Mumbai, and did two years of ISC at The Cathedral & John Connon School, Mumbai. Thereafter he graduated in economics from St. Xavier's College, Mumbai. He then went to University College, Oxford, earning the degrees of Bachelor of Arts in jurisprudence (promoted to Master of Arts by seniority) and Bachelor of Civil Law.

While at Oxford he made six first-class cricket appearances for Oxford University and one for a combined Oxford and Cambridge side against the 1987 Pakistani touring team. He was awarded a cricket Blue at Oxford.

Career

Sardesai worked with The Times of India for six years, after joining it in October 1988, and was the city editor of its Mumbai edition. He entered television journalism in 1994 as Political Editor of New Delhi Television (NDTV). He was the Managing Editor of both NDTV 24X7 and NDTV India and was responsible for overseeing the news policy for both. He hosted popular shows like The Big Fight at NDTV.

He quit NDTV on 17 April 2005 to start his own company, Global Broadcast News (GBN), in collaboration with the American giant CNN and Raghav Bahl's TV18. The latter broadcasts the Indian Edition (in English) of CNBC called CNBC-TV18, the Hindi consumer channel, CNBC Awaaz and an international channel, SAW. The new channel with Sardesai as the Editor-in-Chief was named CNN-IBN. It went on air on 17 December 2005. Channel 7 has also come under this umbrella after Sardesai's company bought a 46 percent stake in the channel. Channel 7 was later renamed IBN7.

On 29 May 2014, Reliance Industries Ltd announced it would be acquiring control in Network 18 Media & Investments Ltd, the parent of CNN-IBN, IBN7 and CNBC-TV18. Subsequently, on 1 July 2014, Sardesai, editor-in-chief of CNN-IBN, along with the entire founding team — editorial and managerial — resigned from the Network18 group.

Personal life
He is married to journalist and author Sagarika Ghose. Sardesai and Ghose have two children, son Ishan, and daughter Tarini.

Controversy
On 30 September 2014, Sardesai was allegedly heckled by a group of Indians in the Madison Square of New York, however, the person representing the group denied these allegations and claimed that Rajdeep "begun the physical assault".

Sardesai and others were acquitted of defamation by a Hyderabad court in November 2019 after issuing an unconditional apology to IPS officer Rajiv Trivedi for false reporting on his role in the death of Sohrabuddin Sheikh.

In January 2021, Sardesai was taken off TV for two weeks by India Today while also cutting his monthly salary for alleging in a retracted tweet that Navreet Singh was killed in a police shooting during 2020–2021 Indian farmers' protest. Delhi Police claimed that his tweet on the cause of death was not accurate and referred to the CCTV footage of the incident of Singh's death. Later, Sardesai was booked for sedition over the Republic Day violence and the FIR stated that they shared misinformed news and ‘instigated violence’ on 26 January. Several journalists and politicians who reported about the 2021 Farmers' Republic Day parade were charged with sedition by the Delhi police and 5 state police in the BJP-ruled states. Siddharth Varadarajan called the police FIRs "malicious prosecution". Press Club of India (PCI), the Editors’ Guild of India, the Press Association, the Indian Women's Press Corps (IWPC), the Delhi Union of Journalists and the Indian Journalists Union in a joint press conference asked the sedition law to be scrapped. Editors Guild of India spoke against invoking of the sedition charge on journalists. The guild termed the FIRs as an "attempt to intimidate, harass, browbeat and stifle the media".

Awards

 The Padma Shri, awarded by the Govt of India, in 2008
 The International Broadcasters award for coverage of the 2002 Gujarat riots and the Ramnath Goenka Excellence in Journalism award for 2006
 In ENBA award 2020 Rajdeep Sardesai received lifetime achievement award.

Books
2019: How Modi Won India
2019 Modi Ki Jeet
Newsman: Tracking India in the Modi Era, published by Rupa Publications India, 6 August 2018
2014: The Election that Changed India, released on 1 November 2014
2014 Chunav : Jisne Bharat Ko Badal Diya
Democracy's XI, published by Juggernaut Books 
Team Loktantra Bhartiya Cricket Ki Shandar Kahani 
Co-authored chapter "The Truth Hurts: Gujarat and the Role of the Media" in the book Gujarat:The making of a tragedy, edited by Siddharth Varadarajan and published by Penguin. The book is about the 2002 Gujarat riots.
Real Heroes

References

External links
 

1965 births
Living people
Recipients of the Padma Shri in literature & education
Indian male television journalists
St. Xavier's College, Mumbai alumni
Alumni of University College, Oxford
Indian television news anchors
Indian opinion journalists
Indian cricketers
Cathedral and John Connon School alumni
Oxford and Cambridge Universities cricketers
20th-century Indian journalists
Goan people
Gujarati people
21st-century Indian journalists
Oxford University cricketers